Widegren is a Swedish surname. Notable people with the surname include:

 Jennie Widegren (born 1973), Swedish dancer and choreographer
 Cecilia Widegren (born 1973), Swedish politician
 Pontus Widegren (born 1990), Swedish professional golfer

Swedish-language surnames